A Frightful Blunder is a 1913 American silent drama film featuring Harry Carey.

Cast
 Charles West as The Young Businessman
 Viola Barry as The Young Woman
 Walter Miller as The Pharmacist
 Kate Bruce as The Young Woman's Mother
 William A. Carroll as A Customer
 Harry Carey as The Superintendent

See also
 Harry Carey filmography

External links

1913 films
1913 short films
American silent short films
American black-and-white films
1913 drama films
Films directed by Anthony O'Sullivan
Silent American drama films
1910s American films